William Warren White (1844 – June 12, 1890) was an American Major League Baseball player who played mainly third base for six different teams in his six seasons of professional baseball, five of which were in the National Association and one season in the Union Association.

Early life
Born in Milton, New York, he also played under the name William Warren.  Before he played professional baseball, Warren served in the Civil War from 1861 to 1865 as part of the 14th Heavy Artillery Regiment New York.  He joined the Union Army, and began working as a clerk for the Paymaster General in Washington, D.C.

Career
He was a player-manager for the Baltimore Canaries during the 1874 season, finishing in 8th place with a 9-38 record.  The team would fold after the season, and Warren would never manage in the majors again.

In , White was elected and served as the Secretary of the Union Association, while also serving as the delegate from the Washington Nationals.  He also played in four games for Washington, gathering just one hit in 18 at bats.  After the season, he was re-elected as Secretary of the Association, but the league folded before the  season.

Post-career
White was listed as having various clerk jobs for the federal government after his playing career.  He died in Little Rock, Arkansas at the age of 46 and was buried in Ballston Spa Village Cemetery in Ballston Spa, New York.

References

External links

1844 births
1890 deaths
19th-century baseball players
Baseball player-managers
Baseball players from New York (state)
Major League Baseball third basemen
Washington Olympics players
Washington Nationals (NA) players
Washington Blue Legs players
Baltimore Canaries players
Baltimore Canaries managers
Chicago White Stockings players
Washington Nationals (UA) players
Rochester (minor league baseball) players
Union Army soldiers
Burials in Saratoga County, New York